Australian Football in the Northern Territory (The Territory) (typically referred to by its official name "Australian Football" or more simply as "football" or "footy") is the most popular sport, particularly with indigenous Australian communities in Darwin, Alice Springs and the Tiwi Islands. It is governed by AFL Northern Territory.

18% of all Territorians in 2017 participated in Australian Football, the highest participation in Australia (and second worldwide only to Australian rules football in Nauru).  The sport also produces more professional Australian Footballers per capita in the Australian Football League than any other state or territory.

The Territory is home to several representative teams, most notably the Aboriginal All-Stars and the Flying Boomerangs. Both Darwin and Alice Springs have strong local competitions, the semi-professional Northern Territory Football League and Central Australian Football League which draw a significant audience. A professional club, the Northern Territory Football Club (NT Thunder) was formed in 2008 and competed in the second tier semi-national NEAFL competition. Following a 2018 scoping study, in 2021 the Northern Territory AFL taskforce launched an official bid to enter a team into the national Australian Football League (AFL) competition which is under consideration by the league for entry around 2030.

The Territory briefly had its own team making its interstate representational debut at the 1988 Adelaide Bicentennial Carnival. Selected under State of Origin criteria, the team, featuring Maurice Rioli, Michael Long and Michael McLean went through undefeated to take out the Division 2 premiership with big wins against Tasmania, the VFA and the national amateurs team. However it has only ever appeared once. After taking over as governing body the AFL Commission merged The Territory with Queensland to create a composite side. The QLD/NT side featured only six Territorians. They failed to gel with the Queenslanders, performed poorly, and a senior team has never represented The Territory since. The AFL however created a talent pathway with The Territory fielding underage teams in the AFL National Championships which have won Division 2 titles at Under 16 level in 1999 and at Under 19 level in 2004 and 2012.

Since the debut of Reuben Cooper in 1969 a large number of born and raised Territorians have played in the AFL. However a significant percentage have launched their professional football careers from other states, particularly South Australia, Western Australia and Queensland. Two dynasties from the Northern Territory have together produced numerous prominent footballers: the Rioli and Long families. Australian Football Hall of Famer Maurice Rioli was known also for his career in the WAFL prior to playing in Victoria. Perhaps the most accomplished born and raised AFL player is Hall of Famer Andrew McLeod. Fellow Hall of Famer Nathan Buckley is the only Territorian to win the prestigious Brownlow Medal. Darwin-born Shaun Burgoyne holds both the AFL games and goals records for a Territorian with 407 games and 302 goals. Shaun Burgoyne and Cyril Rioli have played in 4 AFL premierships, more than any other Territorian. In the AFL Women's, Danielle Ponter (of the Rioli-Long) family is the most prominent having kicked the most goals and played the most games for a born and raised Territorian.

History

 

Prior to separation from South Australia, during the 1870s and 1880s the local media reported almost equally on both Australian rules and rugby, there was a growing awareness of international rugby and also of both American football and soccer. Australian rules began to gain favour in the Territory late 1880s due mainly to South Australia's involvement in intercolonials with Victoria. Apart from the difficulties presented by distance and population, attempts to form a local football club were hampered by the lack of an oval, with the only oval in the territory being by destroyed white ants. Following separation from South Australia in 1911, soccer was the first form of football played in the Territory, against sailors in 1912, however there were insufficient local footballers to field a full team. The first rugby match was played on 3 February 1916, and an Australian rules match was also planned for that day but proved difficult to organise due to insufficient numbers.

The first recorded match of Australian Football in Darwin was played in Saturday 12 February 1916 on Darwin Town Oval between Red and Blue (32) and Red and White (20). It was followed by a second match the following Saturday organised as a Red Cross fundraiser. The NT Football Association was formed shortly thereafter with its first regular competition matches beginning in March 1916.

The Northern Territory Football League chose to play in the Northern Territory's 'wet season', primarily due to hard playing surfaces during the 'dry season'. Games were played on the Esplanade or Town Oval. Most other leagues in Australia operate during the winter, but since the Territory does not have a winter, it is played at different times.  The Wanderers Football Club were the founding members of the league in 1916.

By 1940, football matches in Darwin were not only highly popular with the indigenous community but also highly multicultural with a high percentage of the crowd being Chinese.

John Pye and Andy Howley introduced Australian rules football to the Tiwi Islands in 1941, which grew to become the most popular sport on the islands. Within a couple of decades, the major Australian leagues began to take an interest with the first player offered a contract being Joe Saturninas in 1955 followed by the more successful David Kantilla in the SANFL and later by Maurice Rioli in the VFL. Today around a third of the Territorians in the national AFL are from the two islands. The Tiwi Islands Football League is a strong competition which feeds players into the NTFL. Skills of the TIFL players are widely celebrated. The TIFL Grand Final is the largest event on the island and a major tourist drawcard.

The Central Australian Football Association began in 1947 and quickly became Alice Springs most popular sport.

In 1974, the Gove Australian Football League began, establishing the sport in Arnhem Land and the Gove Peninsula. In 1988, competition began in the Katherine region with the establishment of the Katherine District Football League. At the inland townships of Tennant Creek and to a lesser extent Katherine, rugby league is popular due to it being established earlier (at Tennant Creek in the 1930s and Katherine in the 1960s) and the strong Queensland influence being close to the inland route between Queensland, Darwin and Alice Springs. Nevertheless, the Barkly Australian Football League was formed in 1991 to cater for increased popularity of Australian rules in the remote communities of the region.

In 1991, Marrara Oval was increased in capacity, and became the new home for the NTFL and AFL matches. The first AFL pre-season fixture between Collingwood and West Coast was played in February 1992 in front of a crowd of 11,000 spectators.

In 1991, Darwin hosted the first Arafura Games, the first international competition to include the sport of Australian Rules, and local teams have competed against nations from around the world.  The city has hosted the games since.

Since the late 1990s, the Aboriginal All-Stars have captured the imagination of indigenous Australians in the Northern Territory, and have gained a huge amount of support.

Recent History

In 2000 the Tanami Football League was formed in the Yuendumu region.

In 2002, a record crowd of 17,500 attended an AFL pre-season practice between the Aboriginal All-Stars and Carlton Football Club.

However, in a deal struck with the Northern Territory government, Melbourne based Western Bulldogs AFL side has played several home games a year at Marrara Oval.

The first NT women's league was founded in 2004 as a division of the NTFL in Darwin.

In 2004, Alice Springs main ground Traeger Park was re-developed and has hosted several AFL exhibition matches.

In 2007, a representative side began in earnest a campaign to join a major league, the SANFL, WAFL or QAFL with the new team split between Alice Springs and Darwin. A decision was reached in late 2008, with the Northern Territory Football Club, known as the Thunder, formed to field a team in the Queensland competition from the 2009 season onwards. The Thunder now play in the NEAFL, an elite competition for clubs from Queensland, New South Wales and Canberra as well as the reserve teams of four AFL clubs (Sydney, GWS Giants, Brisbane and Gold Coast).

In 2009, a league was established on Groote Eylandt which quickly became popular. In 2012, the Wilurrara Tjataku Football League was established due to the substantial obstacles faced by remote communities to travel to Alice Springs.

In 2017, the AFL's Melbourne Football Club and Melbourne Cricket Club began a fundraiser to turf the desert football ground surface at Northern Territory home of the Ltyentye Apurte Community 80 km south east of Alice Springs. Completed in 2021, the softer ground helped establish a new league, the CAFL Country League Premiership.

NT women will play a prominent role in the Crows team, with the teams playing under a combined Northern Territory/South Australia banner. There are eight clubs in the competition. As of the start of 2017, these NT teams have contributed the following players:
Wanderers: Sophie Armitstead, midfield/defender; Stevie-Lee Thompson, midfielder.
Waratahs: Angela Foley, midfielder; Abbey Holmes, forward; Heather Anderson, defender; Lauren O'Shea defender/ruck.
St Marys: Tayla Thorn, utility.
Tracy Village: Sally Riley, utility.
Darwin Buffaloes: Jasmine Anderson, midfielder.

Team of the Century
On 3 September 2016 the AFLNT named their team of the 20th century.

Coach of the Century: John Taylor.

Representative Sides
The Northern Territory was represented in early Interstate matches in Australian rules football, before being incorporated into the QLD/NT and then Australian Alliance representative sides. They won the Australian National Football Carnival (Div 2) Championship in 1988.

At Under 16 and Under 18 level, the territory fields teams in the national championships.

The Aboriginal All-Stars, a team composed of indigenous Australian players mostly from the AFL and all over the country, are based in Darwin.  Darwin is also home of the Flying Boomerangs, the junior indigenous side, which has toured the world to play matches against other countries.

Participation
In 2017, AFLNT reported 44,729 direct participants in Australian Rules through official competitions or programs, which makes up 18% of the NT population. There are also around 15,000 more participants in AFL promotional activities.

Around half of all participants are in non-metropolitan areas of the Territory, and a growing 34% of participants are women.

The Tiwi Islands is said to have the highest participation rate in Australia (35%) .

Audience

Attendance Record
 17,500 (2002). (AFL pre-season practice) Aboriginal All-Stars vs Carlton.  (Marrara Oval, Darwin)

Major Australian Rules Events in the Northern Territory
Northern Territory Football League Grand Final
Tiwi Islands Football League Grand Final
Arafura Games (quadrennial)
Australian Football League Premiership Season (Melbourne 'home' games)

Players

Greats
The Northern Territory has produced a disproportionate amount of talent for elite leagues such as the Australian Football League and South Australian National Football League and West Australian Football League, including many indigenous Australian players.  

Australian Football Hall of Famers include: Maurice Rioli, Michael Long, Andrew McLeod and Nathan Buckley. 

Other notable players include: Shaun Burgoyne, Michael McLean, Daryl White, Aaron Davey, Cyril Rioli, Joel Bowden, Brad Ottens, Matthew Stokes, Ronnie Burns, Peter Burgoyne, David Kantilla, Jared Brennan, Matthew Whelan, Daniel Motlop, Richard Tambling, Gilbert McAdam, Fabian Francis, Xavier Clarke and Dean Rioli.

Men's

AFL players from the NT

Women's
Without a local AFLW club, the NT government had an investment partnership with Adelaide women's club between 2017 and 2019 and the club played home games in NT. Early in the AFLW many of the women's players started their career in Adelaide with the Adelaide Crows until the introduction of expansion clubs. As such there was a very strong NT influence in the early years of the Adelaide women's side.

AFLW players from the NT

Leagues
For a list of clubs in each league, see List of Australian rules football clubs in Northern Territory

Open

State-wide leagues
Top End Australian Football Association

Darwin metropolitan leagues
Northern Territory Football League

Regional leagues
Central Australian Football League
Barkly Australian Football League
Katherine District Football League
Gove Australian Football League
Tiwi Islands Football League
Wilurrara Tjataku Football League
Tanami Football League
CAFL Country League

Women's
Northern Territory Women's Aussie Rules Football Association  Official Site

Masters
Masters Australian Football NT Official Site

Principal venues

See also
AFL Northern Territory
Northern Territory Football League

References

External links
NT Team of the Century from Full Points Footy
Even a Cyclone can't stop the footy

 
Northern
History of Australian rules football